Myosotis umbrosa is a species of flowering plant in the family Boraginaceae, endemic to the South Island of New Zealand. Heidi Meudt, Jessica Prebble and Michael Thorsen described the species. Plants of this species of forget-me-not are perennial with a prostrate habit, bracteate inflorescences, and white corollas.

Taxonomy and etymology 
Myosotis umbrosa Meudt et al. is in the plant family Boraginaceae and was originally described in 2018 by Heid Meudt, Jessica Prebble and Michael Thorsen. It is morphologically most similar to M. antarctica and M. lyallii, but can be distinguished from them and other bracteate-prostrate species of Myosotis by a combination of retrorse (backward facing) hairs on the underside of the leaf, hooked hairs on the base of the calyx, and flowers sometimes slightly below cauline leaf axils. 

The type specimen of Myosotis umbrosa is lodged at the herbarium (WELT) of the Museum of New Zealand, Te Papa Tongarewa.

The specific epithet, umbrosa, is derived from the Latin word umbra (shadow, shade) and is a nod to its shady habitat near rock tors.

Phylogeny 
Myosotis umbrosa was not included in phylogenetic analyses of standard DNA sequencing markers (nuclear ribosomal DNA and chloroplast DNA regions).

Description 
Myosotis umbrosa plants are single rosettes. The rosette leaves are 4–14 per plant, and have petioles 6–25 mm long. The rosette leaf blades are 6–31 mm long by 4–10 mm wide (length: width ratio 1.7–3.2: 1), widest at or above the middle, usually oblanceolate to narrowly obovate, with an obtuse apex. The upper surface of the leaf is sparsely to densely covered in flexuous, patent to erect, antrorse (forward-facing) hairs that are oriented at an angle relative to the mid vein. The lower surface of the leaf is sparsely to densely covered in flexuous, patent to erect, retrorse (backward-facing) hairs, that are also angled relative to the mid vein. Each rosette has 2–7 prostrate, unbranched, bracteate inflorescences that are 11–110 mm long. The cauline leaves are similar in size, shape and hairs to the rosette leaves, but smaller and becoming sessile toward the tips of the inflorescences. There can be up to 13 flowers in each inflorescence, each one borne on a short pedicel and with a cauline leaf. The calyx is 2–3 mm long at flowering and 3–5 mm long at fruiting, lobed to about half of its length, and densely covered in long, flexuous, patent to erect antrorse hairs, with some hooked hairs and some retrorse hairs near the calyx base. The corolla is white and up to 5 mm in diameter, with a cylindrical tube, petals that are broadly to very broadly obovate and flat, and small yellow scales alternating with the petals. The anthers are fully included, or rarely partially exserted with the tips just reaching or surpassing the scales. The four smooth, shiny, light to dark brown nutlets are 1.6–1.7 mm long by 1.2–1.3 mm wide and ovoid to broadly ovoid in shape.

Myosotis umbrosa has M. australis type pollen with 8, 10 or 12 apertures.

The chromosome number of M. umbrosa is unknown.

It flowers and fruits mainly from December to February.

Distribution and habitat 
Myosotis umbrosa is endemic to the South Island of New Zealand in Otago, known only from the Rock and Pillar and Lammerlaw Ranges, from 915–1370 m elevation. It is found in shady, rocky areas often at the base of tors.

Conservation status 
The species is listed as Threatened - Nationally Critical in the most recent assessment (2017–2018) of the New Zealand Threatened Classification for plants. It also has the qualifiers "DP" (Data Poor), "RR" (Range Restricted), and "Sp" (Sparse).

References

External links 

 Myosotis umbrosa occurrence data from Australasian Virtual Herbarium

umbrosa
Endemic flora of New Zealand
Endangered flora of New Zealand
Plants described in 2018